The 1970 Washington State Cougars football team was an American football team that represented Washington State University in the Pacific-8 Conference (Pac-8) during the 1970 NCAA University Division football season. In their third season under head coach Jim Sweeney, the Cougars compiled a 1–10 record (0–7 in Pac-8, last), and were outscored 460 to 231.

The team's statistical leaders included Ty Paine with 1,581 passing yards, Bob Ewen with 667 rushing yards, and Ed Armstrong with 488 receiving yards.

Due to the fire at Rogers Field in April, all home games were played at Joe Albi Stadium in Spokane in 1970 and 1971. AstroTurf was installed there in the summer of 1970.

For the second straight year, Washington State played a full conference schedule and went winless. The only victory was in September over neighbor Idaho in the Battle of the Palouse, the sole meeting in a three-year span. The annual rivalry game was not played the previous season (and in 1971) to allow the Cougars to schedule all seven conference opponents.

Schedule

Roster

All-conference

One Washington State offensive lineman, junior guard Steve Busch, was named to the All-Pac-8 team. On the second team (honorable mention) was senior cornerback Lionel Thomas. Busch made the first team again as a senior in 1971.

NFL Draft
For the first time in five years, no Cougars were selected in the 1971 NFL Draft.

References

External links
 Game program: Idaho vs. WSU at Spokane – September 19, 1970
 Game program: Stanford vs. WSU at Spokane – October 17, 1970
 Game program: USC vs. WSU at Spokane – November 7, 1970
 Game program: Oregon State vs. WSU at Spokane – November 14, 1970
  Game program: Washington vs. WSU at Spokane – November 21, 1970

Washington State
Washington State Cougars football seasons
Washington State Cougars football